Paul Haarhuis and Sjeng Schalken were the defending champions but did not compete that year.

Byron Black and Thomas Shimada won in the final 6–2, 3–6, 7–5 against John-Laffnie de Jager and Robbie Koenig.

Seeds
Champion seeds are indicated in bold text while text in italics indicates the round in which those seeds were eliminated.

 Byron Black /  Thomas Shimada (champions)
 Scott Humphries /  Jim Thomas (first round)
 John-Laffnie de Jager /  Robbie Koenig (final)
 Petr Luxa /  Radek Štěpánek (quarterfinals)

Draw

External links
 2001 Heineken Open Shanghai Doubles Draw

Kingfisher Airlines Tennis Open
2001 ATP Tour